I, Jonathan is the fourth solo album by Jonathan Richman, released by the Rounder Records label in 1992. As the founder of influential proto-punk band The Modern Lovers, Richman had strived to convey authentic emotions and storytelling with his music. I, Jonathan continued this aesthetic with simple and sparse rock and roll arrangements, and straightforward lyrics about everyday topics, such as music, parties, summer, and dancing. It is widely-regarded as one of his best works, and is considered an influential album in the lo-fi genre.

Songs on the album addressed topics such as backyard parties ("Parties in the U.S.A"), memories of neighborhoods in which Richman had lived ("Rooming House on Venice Beach" and "Twilight in Boston") and his admiration of his primary musical inspiration, the Velvet Underground ("Velvet Underground").  The latter song includes a brief interlude of the Velvet Underground song, "Sister Ray".

The album helped increase Richman's cultural profile, which would include a 1993 appearance on Late Night with Conan O'Brien during which Richman performed one of the album's songs, "I Was Dancing in the Lesbian Bar."

The album was recorded through the summer of 1991 "in John "Guitar" Girton's cozy frayed carpet of a basement studio" in the "summer swelter" of Grass Valley, California. 

The album was originally released on Cassette and Compact Disc, but was released by Craft Recordings on vinyl for the first time in 2020.

Track listing
All songs were written by Jonathan Richman unless otherwise noted.

Personnel
Jonathan Richman - vocals, guitars, bass ("Velvet Underground")
Ned Claflin - vocals, tremolo guitar and 2nd guitar on "Grunion Run"
Tom Nelson - vocals
Scot Woodland - vocals, congas
Josef Marc - bass, drums ("I Was Dancing In The Lesbian Bar"), guitar ("Twilight in Boston")
Steve Nobels - percussion, backing singing
Jason Wilkinson - percussion, drums ("Parties in the USA"), backing singing
John Rinkor - percussion, bass ("Parties in the USA"), backing singing
Mike Buckmaster - percussion, backing singing
Willie Robertson - percussion, backing singing
Andy Paley - drums ("Grunion Run")
Brennan Totten - drums ("A Higher Power")
Jim Washburn - bass ("That Summer Feeling", "Twilight in Boston" and "Grunion Run")
John Girton - guitar ("That Summer Feeling")
Brennan Totten - producer
John Girton - engineer

References

1992 albums
Jonathan Richman albums
Rounder Records albums